Electa may refer to:

People
 Mary Electa Allen (1858–1941), American photographer; co-founder of the Deerfield Society of Blue and White Needlework
 Electa Arenal (1935-1969), Mexican artist
 Electa Johnson (1909-2004), American author, lecturer, adventure and sail training pioneer
 Electa Amanda Wright Johnson (1838-1929), American philanthropist
 Electa Quinney (1798–1885), Mohican; member of the Stockbridge-Munsee Community
 Electa Nobles Lincoln Walton (1824-1908), American educator, lecturer, writer and suffragist
 Electa Matilda Ziegler (1841-1932), American philanthropist

Fauna
 Alvania electa, species of minute sea snail
 Catocala electa, moth
 Eulepidotis electa, moth
 Nomada electa, species of nomad bee
 Odostomia electa, species of sea snail
 Zonosemata electa, species of tephritid or fruit flies